Ratchakit Prakan Stadium is a multi-purpose stadium in Satun Province, Thailand. It is currently used mostly for football matches and is the home stadium of Satun United F.C.

References

Multi-purpose stadiums in Thailand
Buildings and structures in Satun province
Sport in Satun province